NGC 5018 is an elliptical galaxy located in the constellation of Virgo at an approximate distance of 132.51 Mly. NGC 5018 was discovered in 1788 by William Herschel.

One supernova, 2021fxy (mag. 13.9, type Ia), has been discovered in March 2021 in NGC 5018.

See also
Galaxy

References

External links 
 

5018
Virgo (constellation)
Elliptical galaxies
Astronomical objects discovered in 1788